Euthydemus II was a Greco-Bactrian king who ruled in Bactria in 185-180 BCE.

Rule
Son of Demetrius I of Bactria, Euthydemus II became king in the 180s BCE, either after his father's death or as a sub-king to him. The style and rare nickel alloys of his coins associates him closely in time with the king Agathocles but their precise relation remains uncertain. Euthydemus is pictured as a boy on his coins and most likely died very young.

He was the last Euthydemid ruler of the Greco-Bactrian Kingdom and perhaps related with king Xiutu of Gansu.

Coinage

See also
 Greco-Bactrian Kingdom
 Seleucid Empire
 Greco-Buddhism
 Indo-Scythians
 Indo-Parthian Kingdom
 Kushan Empire

Notes

References
 The Greeks in Bactria and India, W. W. Tarn, Cambridge University Press.

External links
 Catalogue of Coins of Euthydemus II

2nd-century BC rulers in Asia
Euthydemid dynasty